Gachi Bolaghi-ye Sofla (also Romanized as Gachī Bolāghī-ye Soflá) is a village in Arshaq-e Markazi Rural District, Arshaq District, Meshgin Shahr County, Ardabil Province, Iran. At the 2006 census, its population was 84, in 17 families.

References 

Towns and villages in Meshgin Shahr County